Glespin is a hamlet in South Lanarkshire, Scotland. It is on the A70, east of Muirkirk and west of Douglas.

Notable people
Footballer Bobby Crawford, who played almost 400 Football League games for Preston North End, was born in Glespin in 1901.

Villages in South Lanarkshire